Daniel Mitterdorfer (born July 25, 1989) is an Austrian professional ice hockey Defenseman currently playing for HC TWK Innsbruck in the Austrian Hockey League (EBEL). He has previously played for EC Red Bull Salzburg and EHC Black Wings Linz. He participated with the Austrian national team at the 2015 IIHF World Championship.

References

External links

1989 births
Living people
Austrian ice hockey defencemen
People from Innsbruck-Land District
EHC Black Wings Linz players
HC TWK Innsbruck players
EC Red Bull Salzburg players
Sportspeople from Tyrol (state)